Jangal Rural District is a rural district (dehestan) in Jangal District, Roshtkhar County, Razavi Khorasan Province, Iran. At the 2006 census, its population was 5,066, in 1,080 families.  The rural district has 10 villages.

References 

Rural Districts of Razavi Khorasan Province
Roshtkhar County